The Horchheim rail bridge is a railway bridge across the Rhine in Koblenz, Germany. The first bridge on the site was put into operation in 1879, but was badly damaged at the end of the second world war. The bridge was temporarily restored to service in 1947, and the current bridge replaced it in 1961.

Bridges completed in 1879
Bridges over the Rhine
Buildings and structures in Koblenz
Railway bridges in Germany
Railway lines in Rhineland-Palatinate
Railway lines opened in 1879
Transport in Koblenz
1879 establishments in Germany